Moscow Airport may refer to:

Serving Moscow, Russia

Commercial passenger and cargo traffic airports
 Moscow Domodedovo Airport
 Sheremetyevo International Airport
 Vnukovo International Airport
 Zhukovsky International Airport

Private and military air traffic
 Myachkovo Airport
 Ostafyevo International Airport
 Chkalovsky Airport
 Kubinka (air base)

Defunct airports
 Khodynka Aerodrome
 Tushino Airfield
 Bykovo Airport

Serving Moscow, Idaho, United States
 Pullman–Moscow Regional Airport (also serving Pullman, Washington)